The Dave Tyler Junior Player of the Year Award, formerly known as USA Hockey Junior Player of the Year Award, is presented annually to the most outstanding American-born player in junior ice hockey. Chosen by panel of junior coaches and administrators, criteria for the award also includes having played for a US-based junior team.

The award is named after Dave Tyler, who served on USA Hockey's board of directors for 32 years and played an instrumental role in the development and growth of junior hockey in the United States.

List of winners

References

External links
USA Hockey Annual Awards

American ice hockey trophies and awards
United States Hockey League trophies and awards
North American Hockey League
Junior ice hockey in the United States